Mylswamy Annadurai, popularly known as Moon Man of India , is an Indian scientist working as vice president for Tamil Nadu State Council for Science and Technology (TNSCST), Chairman, Board of Governors, National Design and Research Forum(NDRF. He was born on 2 July 1958, in a village called Kothavadi near Pollachi in Coimbatore district, Tamil Nadu state of India). Prior to taking this assignment he was with Indian Space Research Organisation and served as Director, ISRO Satellite Centre (ISAC), Bangalore. During his 36 years of service in ISRO, he had some of the major contributions, including two of the major missions of ISRO, namely Chandrayaan-1 and Mangalyaan. Annadurai has been listed among 100 Global thinkers of 2014 and topped the innovators list. His works are mentioned in textbooks of Tamil Nadu Board of Secondary Education

Early life and education
Annadurai had his schooling in his native village Kodhawady  and nearby town Pollachi. He has obtained a bachelor's degree in engineering (electronics and communication) in 1980 from Government College of Technology, Coimbatore, Tamil Nadu, India, and completed his master's degree in engineering during 1982 from PSG College of Technology, Coimbatore and PhD from Anna University of Technology, Coimbatore, Tamil Nadu in India. He joined ISRO in 1982. As the mission director of INSAT missions, he had some of the original contributions to the INSAT systems maintenance.

Mars Orbiter Mission

India's first mission to Mars, the Mars Orbiter Mission, or Mangalyaan, reached the planet on 24 September 2014 completing its 300-day journey. While ISRO has been researching for a Mars mission for many years, the project was only approved by the government in August 2012. ISRO took over a year to work on the spacecraft and bring the project to implementation stage. The Mars Orbiter Mission was launched on 5 November 2013 from the Satish Dhawan Space Centre in Sriharikota, Andhra Pradesh, on the country's east coast. After travelling 670 million kilometres, Mangalyaan is now set to study the surface features, morphology, mineralogy and Martian atmosphere to better understand the climate, geology, origin, evolution and sustainability of life on the planet. It is the most cost effective of all the missions sent to the planet by any other country costing India about $74 million.

Chandrayaan I & II

Chandrayaan-1, was India's first mission to the Moon launched by India's national space agency, the Indian Space Research Organisation (ISRO). The unmanned lunar exploration mission included a lunar orbiter and an impactor. India launched the spacecraft by a modified version of the PSLV C11 on 22 October 2008 from Satish Dhawan Space Centre, Sriharikota, Nellore District, Andhra Pradesh about 80 km north of Chennai at 06:22 IST (00:52 UTC). The mission was a major boost to India's space program, and India joined a band of Asian nations (China and Japan) in exploring the Moon. The vehicle was successfully inserted into lunar orbit on 8 November 2008.

During the period 2004–2008, as the project director for Chandrayaan I, he led a team of engineers and scientists that designed and developed the project to carry instrumentation from ISRO and from NASA, ESA, and Bulgaria to accomplish simultaneous chemical, mineralogical, resource and topographic mapping of the entire lunar surface at high spatial and spectral resolutions. The project was realised within the time frame stipulated and the budget granted. He has paved the way for the future of Indian planetary missions and set an example for the international co-operation bringing the reputed international organisations like NASA, ESA, JAXA to work under the leadership of ISRO. Chandrayaan I has received many national and international awards including, the coveted Space Pioneers award for science and engineering at 28th International conference on Space development, in Florida USA in 2009.

Director, ISRO Satellite Centre
2015 to 2018 Annadurai was heading ISRO Satellite Centre, Bangalore as director. The centre is responsible for building state of the art satellites for communication, remote sensing, navigation, space science and interplanetary missions.In his tenure as Director of the centre he has overseen making, launching and operationalisation of 30 state of the art satellites

Post retirement from ISRO
In 2019 Mylswamy Annadurai has been appointed as vice president for Tamil Nadu State Council for Science and Technology. In the same year he has been also nominated as chairman, Board of Governors, National Design and Research Forum(NDRF) He uses both  the positions effectively for the development of science and technology both at the state and national level, starting from science out reach at school level to guiding some high end collaborative research of social relevance by bringing together  research labs, academia,  industry and policy makers,

Films
 In the movie Mission Mangal based on India's Mars mission, the character of Akshay Kumar  is inspired from Annadurai 
 In the feature film Chandrayaan based on India's first Moon mission Chandrayaan-1 directed and produced by Santhosh George Kulangara,  his and his family members'   roles were enacted by south Indian cine artists.

Previous assignments
During his 36 years of service in ISRO Dr Annadurai held various responsibilities. Prior to become the Centre Ditector, he served as programme director for IRS&SSS (Indian Remote Sensing & Small, Science and Student Satellites) that include Chandrayaan-1, Chandrayaan-2, ASTROSAT, Aditya-L1, Mars Orbiter Mission and many Indian Remote Sensing missions. He also contributed to India's National Communication satellite (INSAT) missions as the Mission Director. He was the member secretary of the task team that prepared Chandrayaan I project report. He is the author of several research papers in his specialization.

Annadurai's career profile is as follow,

 1982     : Joined ISRO
 1985-88  : Team leader to develop S/W satellite Simulator
 1988-92  : Spacecraft operations manager, IRS-1A
 1992-96  : Spacecraft operations manager, INSAT-2A
 1993-96  : Spacecraft operations manager, INSAT-2B
 1994-96  : Deputy project director, INSAT-2C
 1996-01  : Mission director, INSAT-2C
 1997-98  : Mission director, INSAT-2D
 1999-12  : Mission director, INSAT-2E
 2000-10  : Mission director, INSAT-3B
 2001-02  : Mission director, GSAT-1
 2003-11  : Mission director, INSAT-3E
 2003-05  : Associate project director, EDUSAT
 2004-09  : Project director, Chandrayaan-1
 2008-13  : Project director, Chandrayaan-2
 2011-15  : Programme director, IRS & SSS (Indian Remote Sensing & Small, Science and Student Satellites)
 2015-18  : Director, ISRO Satellite Centre, Bangalore
 2019 -   : Vice president, Tamil Nadu State Council for Science and Technology
 2019 -   : Chairman, board of governors, National Research and Design Forum

During his holidays, Annadurai tours across the country to meet and interact with the students to encourage them to study science.

Awards and achievements
Annadurai has received more than hundred awards, that include,

Awards from government
 Padma Shri, 2016, one of the highest civilian awards in India.
 The government of Karnataka awarded him the Rajyotsava Prashasti for Science (2008).

Awards from universities and academia
 Doctor of Science, DSc (Honoris Causa) conferred by Pondicherry University(2009)
 Doctor of Science, DSc (Honoris Causa) conferred by Anna University, Chennai(2009)
 Doctor of Science, DSc (Honoris Causa) conferred by University of Madras, Chennai (2009)
 Doctor of Science, DSc (Honoris Causa) conferred by MGR University, Chennai (2008)
 Eminent Scientist Award from 76th Indian Science Congress – Madurai Kamaraj University Endowment.
 Distinguished Alumni Award, PSG College of Technology, 2009.
 Sir CV Raman Award-2010 from Periyar University, Salem
 Jewel of GCT(Government College of Technology, Coimbatore) by GCT Alumni
 Personality of the year Awarded by St. Johns International School, Chennai
 Hikal Chemcon Distinguished Speaker Award 2010, the 63rd Annual Session of Indian Institute of Chemical Engineers, Annamalai University.
 National Science and Technology Award, 2011, Sathyabama University, Chennai.
 Distinguished Scientist Award, KC College, Mumbai, Diamond Jubilee Award

Awards from ISRO
 Annadurai is the recipient of the Hariom Ashram pretit Vikram Sarabhai Research Award for his outstanding Contributions to Systems analysis and Space systems management(2004).
 He is also the recipient of a citation from ISRO for his contribution to the INSAT systems Mission management(2003)
 Team Excellence award for his contribution to Indian Space Program(2007).
 ISRO Merit Award 2009
 Team Excellence Award 2010 as team leader of Chandrayaan-1 team
 ISRO Outstanding Achievement award, 2014

National and international awards from professional bodies
 Laurels for Team Achievement Chandrayaan-1, International Academy of Astronautics,2013, Beijing China
 Certificate of Appreciation from Boeing Asian – American professional Association, Houston, USA
 Space Systems award, 2009 from American Institute of Aeronautics and Astronautics, US.
 National Aeronautical Award-2008 from Aeronautical Society of India in recognition of his contributions in the field of satellites/spacecraft
 Fellow, International Academy of Astronautics 
 Fellow, Institution of Engineers, India(FIE)
 Fellow, Institution of Electronics and Telecommunication Engineering, India (IETE)
 Fellow, Indian Society for Remote Sensing (ISRS)
 Fellow, Society for shock wave research, Dept.of Aerospace Eng, Indian Institute of Science (IISC), Bangalore
 Fellow, Chennai Science Academy(Formerly Tamil Nadu Science Academy)
 NIQR Bajaj Award for "Outstanding Quality Man 2009"
 H K Firodia awards, 2009 for Science and Technology
 IEI-IEEE Engineering Excellence award 2016 for Contributions and Leadership in Space Technology in service of Humanity
 BHASKARA Award 2016 for his outstanding Scientific Leadership
 SIES (South Indian Education Society) Sri Chandrasekharendra Saraswati National Eminence Award, 2009 for Science and Technology
 "Lifetime Contribution Award" AISYWC-18
 Listed in the TNIE-Uninor Achiever of the year 2009,
 Listed in the Dinamalar-Uninor Achiever of the year 2009,
 Pearl Ratna,2020 by Pearl Education Foundation
 Best Conference paper in the Innovations and Entrepreneurship, Annual Intl Conference by  Industry Studies Association, USA, 3-4 Jun 2021 that carried US$500 cash prize and an award plaque

Awards from social and public forums
 Vivekananda Award for Human Excellence by Rama Krishna Mission
 Kongu Achiever Award 2009 From NIA Trust, Pollachi.
 Best Tamil Scientist Award, Makkal Viruthu, Makkal TV, 2009
 Amara Bharathi National Eminence Award for Science and Technology, 2010
 Karmaveerar Kamaraj Award,2010 from Chennai Mhahajana sabha
 Dr Rajah Sir Muthiah Chettiar Birthday Commemoration Award for 2012.
 "Listed among 100 Global thinkers of 2014 and topped the innovators list "
 Lifetime achievement award, 2015, SRV Schools, Trichy
 Tamilan Award 2016, for Science and Technology by Puthiya Thalaimurai TV
 Global Indian for Science, 2017 awarded by ICICI and Times Group
 Life Time Achievement Award in the field of science and technology by Union Bank of India
 C.Pa.Aditanar Literary Award 2013
 Poorna Chandra award from Rotary Club, Coimbatore.
 Tamil Ma-mani award, from Tirupur Tamil Sangam.
 Tamil Achiever Award,2011 by Bharathi Tamil Sangam, Kolkata.
 Example to Youth Award.
 Kalingarayar Award -2016, by Kongu Charitable Trust, Tamil Nadu
 Citizen Extraordinary Award-2014, by Rotary Club Bangalore
 Lifetime Achievement – Muthamizh Award-2108, Muthamizh Peravai
 "Mars Man", by Front liners- 2018, Kuwait,
 Lifetime Achievement Award, 2019, Rotary International Pollachi
 Life Time Achievement Award, 2019, by Govt Higher Secondary School Alumni, Velandampalayam, Tamil Nadu
 Mahatma Gandhi Award, 2019, Gandhi World Foundation,
 Lifetime Achievement award, 2019, Muscat Tamil Sangam,
 Sri Adhi Sankara Award, 2019, Shri Adhi Sankara Peravai, 
 Sony YAY award,2020,
 Senthamiz Award, 2021, Gandhi World Peace Foundation
 Manavai Mustafa Memorial  Award for Science , 2021

Annadurai's publications and works are being widely referred by satellite operator's, one of his work has been referred in a US patent.

He has written six books in Tamil namely, 
1.Kaiyaruke Nila 
2.Siragai virikkum Mangalyaan
3.Valarum Ariviyal 
4.Ariviyal Kalanjiyam and 
5.Vinnum Mannum. 
6. India-75
The Book" Kaiyaruke Nila" has won S. P. Adithanar Literary award for the year 2013.
The book, " Vinnum Mannum" has wom Manvai Mustafa Memorial Science Award for the year 2021

References

External links
Website on Dr Mylswamy Annadurai's Biography
Video on Mylswamy Annadurai's life
Speeches and Videos of Dr. Mylswamy Annadurai
Mylswamy Annadurai in the electronic media
Chat with India's Moon man
Mylswamy Annadurai in Tamil Media
Moon Man
A Star is born
The man who will give India the moon
MOM in Mission Mode
How ISRO mission gave India the moon it asked for

Annadurai,M
Annadurai,M
Annadurai,M
Annadurai,M
Space programme of India
Annadurai,Mylswamy
Indian lunar exploration programme
Indian aerospace engineers
Recipients of the Padma Shri in science & engineering
20th-century Indian engineers
Recipients of the Rajyotsava Award 2008